Leandro Faggin (18 July 1933 – 6 December 1970) was an Italian racing cyclist, Olympic champion and world champion in track cycling.

Biography
He won a gold medal in the 1000 m time trial at the 1956 Summer Olympics in Melbourne. He was also a member of the Italian team that won a gold medal in team pursuit at the 1956 Olympics.

He is three times gold winner in individual pursuit in the UCI Track World Championships, from 1963, 1965 and 1966, and has also three silver medals and three bronze medals.

Death
Faggin died of cancer aged just 37 years in 1970. In the 2000s, his name was included into a list of cases under investigation for possible use of doping in cycling.

See also
Italian men gold medalist at the Olympics and World Championships

References

1933 births
1970 deaths
Italian male cyclists
Olympic gold medalists for Italy
Cyclists at the 1956 Summer Olympics
Olympic cyclists of Italy
Sportspeople from Padua
Olympic medalists in cycling
Medalists at the 1956 Summer Olympics
UCI Track Cycling World Champions (men)
Italian track cyclists
Cyclists from the Province of Padua
20th-century Italian people